Paraclinus nigripinnis, the Blackfin blenny, is a species of labrisomid blenny native to the western Atlantic Ocean and the Caribbean Sea from southern Florida to Brazil. This species can reach a length of  TL. It can also be found in the aquarium trade.

References

nigripinnis
Fish described in 1867